Darcy Werenka (born May 13, 1973) is a Canadian-Austrian former professional ice hockey defenceman whose career spanned over 20 years enjoying most success in the European Leagues.

Playing career
Werenka was drafted 37th overall by the New York Rangers in the 1991 NHL Entry Draft, but never played in the NHL, instead spending three seasons in the American Hockey League with the Binghamton Rangers.

After playing for different IHL teams in two seasons, Werenka moved to Europe and joined Austrian side Vienna Capitals in 1997, spending two seasons with them.  After a season back in the IHL with the Utah Grizzlies, Werenka returned to Europe and played in Finland's SM-liiga, splitting the year with Jokerit and HPK. He then played two seasons in the Deutsche Eishockey Liga, playing for the SERC Wild Wings and the Kölner Haie. In 2003, he returned to Vienna and helped guide the team to their first ever Austrian ice hockey championship in 2005.

At the latter stages of his career, he moved on from the EBEL in 2011, to enjoy a single season in the French Ligue Magnus with Rouen HE 76.

International play
In April 2008 he gained Austrian Citizenship. Werenka promptly made his debut for the Austrian National Team at the following 2008 IIHF World Championships in Division I. He finished his international career with over 60 appearances.

Career statistics

Awards
 WHL East Second All-Star Team – 1991

References

External links

1973 births
Atlanta Knights players
Brandon Wheat Kings players
Binghamton Rangers players
Canadian ice hockey defencemen
Chicago Wolves (IHL) players
Graz 99ers players
Houston Aeros (1994–2013) players
HPK players
Jokerit players
EC Kapfenberg players
Kölner Haie players
Lethbridge Hurricanes players
Living people
New York Rangers draft picks
Rouen HE 76 players
Quebec Rafales players
Schwenninger Wild Wings players
Ice hockey people from Edmonton
Utah Grizzlies (IHL) players
Vienna Capitals players
Wiener EV players
Canadian expatriate ice hockey players in Austria
Canadian expatriate ice hockey players in France
Canadian expatriate ice hockey players in Finland
Canadian expatriate ice hockey players in Germany